Type 57 may refer to:

 Bugatti Type 57, a 1930s car
 Cadillac Type 57, a 1910s-1920s car
 Peugeot Type 57, a 1904 car
 Hispano-Suiza Type 57, a V-12 aeroengine
 Bristol Type 57 Grampus V, an interwar British biplane passenger aircraft
 Vickers Type 57 Virginia, an interwar British biplane heavy bomber aircraft
 Type 57 heavy machine gun, the Chinese variant of the SGM version of the SG-43 Goryunov

See also

 
 T57 (disambiguation)
 57 (disambiguation)